B. nigra may refer to:

 Ballota nigra, a perennial herb of the family Lamiaceae
 Betula nigra, a species of birch native to the eastern United States from New Hampshire west to southern Minnesota, and south to northern Florida and east Texas
 Brassica nigra, the black mustard, an annual weedy plant cultivated for its seeds, which are commonly used as a spice

See also
 Nigra (disambiguation)